Kari Kaleva Vilonen (born 1955) is a Finnish mathematician, specializing in geometric representation theory. He is currently a professor at the University of Melbourne.

Education 
He received in 1983 his Ph.D from Brown University under Robert MacPherson with thesis The Intersection Homology D-module on Hypersurfaces with Isolated Singularities.

Career 
From 1983 to 1986 was a C. L. E. Moore instructor at the Massachusetts Institute of Technology, on leave in 1984–1985 at the Mathematical Sciences Research Institute in Berkeley, California. Afterward, Vilonen was a  Benjamin Pierce Assistant Professor at Harvard University from 1986 to 1989. From 1989 to 2000 he was a faculty member at Brandeis University, rising to the rank of Professor in 1996. After that, he was a professor at Northwestern University, and then a professor at the University of Helsinki from 2010 to 2015. Starting in 2015, Vilonen has been a professor at the University of Melbourne in Australia.

In 2002, with Dennis Gaitsgory and Edward Frenkel, he proved the geometrical Langlands conjecture for curves over finite fields.

In 2004, Vilonen, Mark Goresky, Dennis Gaitsgory and Edward Frenkel were awarded a multimillion dollar grant from the Defense Advanced Research Projects Agency (DARPA) to work on a project aimed at establishing links between the Langlands program and dualities in quantum field theory. Later, Frenkel wrote, "We felt like we were in uncharted territory: no mathematicians we knew had ever received grants of this magnitude before." The funds were used to coordinate the work of dozens of mathematicians with the goal of making a concerted effort in a significant area of research.

In 2007, with Ivan Mirković, he published "Geometric Langlands duality and representations of algebraic groups over commutative rings", which proved the geometric Satake equivalence, a geometric version of the Satake isomorphism.

In 2013, Vilonen received a Humboldt Prize. In 2014, he was awarded a Simons Fellowship from the Simons Foundation.

In 2020, the Australian Research Council awarded Vilonen an Australian Laureate Fellowship, their highest award to an individual. This five year grant will allow him to address deep longstanding questions about real groups, algebraic objects which describe the basic symmetries occurring in nature.

Awards and keynote addresses 
Vilonen was a Guggenheim Fellow for the academic year 1997/98. In 1998 he was an Invited Speaker with talk Topological methods in representation theory at the International Congress of Mathematicians in Berlin. In 2004 he was elected a member of the Finnish Academy of Science and Letters.

Selected publications

References

Finnish mathematicians
Brown University alumni
Brandeis University faculty
Northwestern University faculty
Academic staff of the University of Helsinki
Members of the Finnish Academy of Science and Letters
1955 births
Living people
Finnish expatriates in the United States
Academic staff of the University of Melbourne
Finnish expatriates in Australia
Harvard University faculty
Massachusetts Institute of Technology fellows